0 is the second studio album by the Icelandic musical project Low Roar, released in 2014 through Tonequake.

"I'll Keep Coming" and "Easy Way Out" became well known in 2016 when they were featured as the trailer music for Hideo Kojima's video game Death Stranding, in addition to an episode of Killjoys. "Breathe In" was featured in the animated documentary film Flee.

Track listing

Year-end charts

References 

2014 albums
Low Roar albums